Ronaldus "Ron" Franciscus Johannes Steens (born 18 June 1952) is a former field hockey player from The Netherlands, who was a member of the Dutch National Team that finished sixth in the 1984 Summer Olympics in Los Angeles, California. Eight years earlier the midfielder was also on the Holland squad, that ended up fourth at the 1976 Summer Olympics in Montreal.

Steens, a powerful midfield player who played club hockey for HC Klein Zwitserland, earned a total number of 166 caps, scoring 43 goals, in the years 1973–1985. He retired from international hockey a year before the 1986 Men's Hockey World Cup in London. His younger brother Tim was also a field hockey international for Holland.

Nowadays, Ron Steens works as a HR consultant at GITP, a HRD consultancy firm, founded in 1947 in collaboration with the Nijmegen University and the Tilburg School of Economics (Netherlands).

References

External links
 
 Dutch Hockey Federation
 GITP

1952 births
Living people
Dutch male field hockey players
Olympic field hockey players of the Netherlands
Field hockey players at the 1976 Summer Olympics
Field hockey players at the 1984 Summer Olympics
Sportspeople from Rotterdam
HC Klein Zwitserland players
1978 Men's Hockey World Cup players
20th-century Dutch people